Mick Bates (born 26 June 1949) is a former Australian rules footballer who played with Essendon in the Victorian Football League (VFL).

Notes

External links 		
		

Essendon Football Club past player profile
		
		
		

Living people
1949 births
Australian rules footballers from Victoria (Australia)		
Essendon Football Club players